Naftal (Arabic: نفطال) is the principal company selling 
petroleum-based fuels for domestic consumption in Algeria; its gas stations are a familiar sight throughout the country. Founded in 1981 by government decree, it was responsible for refining and distribution until 1987. In 1998, it became a subsidiary of Sonatrach. It employs about 30,000 workers, and has about 2300 gas stations (as of 2017).

Activities 
Naftal specializes in the distribution and sale of finished petroleum products and operations of service stations for the domestic market. Naftal managed 1,400 service stations in 2012.

Naftal produces lubricants and naphthenic oils. Naftal manufactures its products in refineries operated by Sonatrach.

In March 2022, Naftal signed a US$364 million engineering, procurement and construction (EPC) contract with Sonatrach's pipeline unit TRC. The pipeline is planned to take about 48 months to construct, and will run 424 km from Arzew to Chlef, carrying about 1.2 million tonnes of LPG a year.

Corporate affairs

Management
Naftal is headed by :

 Hocine Chekired (1999–2001)
 Akli Remini (2001–2005)
 Salah Cherouana (2005–2007)
 Saïd Akretche (2007–2015)
 Hocine Rizou (2015–2017)
 Rachid Nadil (2017–2019)
 Belkacem Harchaoui (10 June 2019–2020)
 Kamel Benfriha (2020) (Interim)
 Kamel Benfriha (8 September 2020–2021)
 Mourad Menouar (12 September 2021–2022)
 Abdelkader Chafi (since 6 October 2022)

References

External links

 Official website

Oil and gas companies of Algeria
Automotive fuel retailers
Companies based in Algiers
Energy companies established in 1981
Motor oils
Non-renewable resource companies established in 1981
Retail companies established in 1981
1981 establishments in Algeria
Algerian brands